The Longtaitou Festival, also known as the Zhonghe Festival, is a traditional Chinese festival held on the second day of the second month of the Chinese calendar. Its name means "Dragon raising its head" because the dragon was regarded as the deity in charge of rain, an important factor in ancient agriculture. The festival is sometimes simply called "Second-month Second" (二月二) for short.

The festival is celebrated around the time of Jingzhe, one of the 24 solar terms (節氣). The phrase Jing Zhe (驚蟄) has the meaning of awakening of the hibernated (implying insects). Jing (驚) is startling, and Zhe (蟄) is hibernated (insects). This is the time during which the hibernating insects begun to wake up at the beginning of early spring, which is often accompanied by the arrival of the first rains, meaning the weather is getting warm. Longtaitou Festival is an important worship ritual of wishing for good harvest in the coming months. In addition to paying  homage to the Dragon King, Tu Di Gong is also worshipped. Another ancient practice to celebrate Longtaitou Festival was to get rid of insect pests in homes via fumigation by burning various herbs with recognized insect repellent effects.

Today, Longtaitou Festival is celebrated in various ways, most of which are still identical to those practiced in the ancient times, including eating Chinese pancakes (春饼) and dragon beard noodles. It is an auspicious day for people to get a haircut, after month-long time without cutting hair in January for Lunar New Year. Women and children carry Perfume bags filled with the powder of ground fragrant herbs for good fortune, though they are no longer used as insect repellent as in ancient times. 

Another ancient celebration still practiced today is that Longtaitou Festival is the first day of the Taihao (太昊) temple fair that lasts until the third day of the third month of the lunar calendar. The fair is a celebration of ancestral deities Fuxi and Nüwa, and the Longtaitou Festival marks the beginning of this celebration.

There were ancient traditions practiced during the festival that are no longer part of the modern celebrations, including:
 Women should not practice sewing because needles could puncture the eyes of dragon.
 Plant ashes were spread around the house, and then inside the house, and finally around the earthen jug, to symbolize inviting the dragon to provide enough rain for good harvests.
 In Guang zhong province it is considered as the birth of land god, people use firecrackers to pray for good weather and good grain. 
 Due to worship of the dragon, some people eat food with the word " dragon" to bring good luck and good weather all year round.

The Zhonghe Festival was an official festival and holiday in the Tang and Song Dynasties, celebrated on the day before the Longtaitou Festival: on the first day of the second month of the Chinese calendar.

Public holidays in China
Festivals in China
Observances set by the Chinese calendar

See also
 Chunshe (Spring Community Day)